Maozhou is a town of Xiong County in east-central Hebei province, China, located  north of downtown Renqiu, which can be accessed by China National Highway 106 and  east of Baoding. , it has 30 villages under its administration.

See also
List of township-level divisions of Hebei

References

Township-level divisions of Hebei